The Australasian New Car Assessment Program (ANCAP) is a car safety performance assessment programme based in Australia and founded in 1993. ANCAP specialises in the crash testing of automobiles sold in Australia and the publishing of these results for the benefit of consumers. ANCAP provides consumers with transparent advice and information on the level of occupant and pedestrian protection provided by different vehicle models in the most common types of crashes, as well as their ability—through technology—to avoid a crash.

Since 1993, ANCAP has published crash test results (as of 2015) for over 515 passenger and light commercial vehicles sold in Australia and New Zealand. Vehicles are awarded an ANCAP safety rating of between one and five stars indicating the level of safety they provide in the event of a crash. The more stars, the better the vehicle performed in ANCAP tests. To achieve the maximum five-star ANCAP safety rating, a vehicle must achieve the highest standards in all tests and feature advanced safety assist technologies.

In 2018, ANCAP adopted the Euro NCAP protocols, with the scoring tweaked to the local conditions.

Member organisations 
 ACT Justice and Community Safety Directorate
 Australian Automobile Association
 Australian Government – Department of Infrastructure and Regional Development
 Automobile Association of the Northern Territory
 FIA Foundation for the Automobile and Society
 New Zealand Automobile Association
 NRMA
 Ministry of Transport (New Zealand)
 NZ Transport Agency
 Queensland Department of Transport & Main Roads
 Royal Automobile Association of South Australia
 Royal Automobile Club of Queensland
 Royal Automobile Club of Tasmania
 Royal Automobile Club of Victoria
 Royal Automobile Club of Western Australia
 SA Department for Infrastructure & Transport
 Tasmanian Department of State Growth
 Transport for NSW – Centre for Road Safety 
 VicRoads
 Victorian Transport Accident Commission
 Western Australia Department of Transport
 Western Australia Office of Road Safety

Testing 

In 2019–2020, 95% of all new vehicles sold were tested.

In 2023, an underwater safety test will be introduced.

Comparison groups 
The results are grouped into 17 increasingly demanding classes:

 1993–1994
 1995–1998
 1999–2000
 2001–2002
 2003–2007
 2008–2010
 2011
 2012
 2013
 2014
 2015
 2016
 2017
 2018–2019
 2020–2022
 2023–2024
 2025+

References

External links 
 
 Overview of ANCAP Tests

New Car Assessment Programs
Transport in Australia
Consumer organisations in Australia